Scopula sacraria is a moth of the family Geometridae. It is found on Cyprus and the European part of Russia.

Subspecies
Scopula sacraria sacraria
Scopula sacraria fumata (Hausmann, 1993) (Cyprus)

Taxonomy
Scopula sacraria is treated as a subspecies of Scopula confinaria by some authors. If sacraria is treated as a valid species, Scopula semitata is sometimes listed as a subspecies of it, rather than a separate species.

References

Moths described in 1910
sacraria
Moths of Europe